Charles Roff (1 January 1952 - 25 September 2017) was a Scottish photographer, gallery owner and bon viveur.

References

External links
https://web.archive.org/web/20171017012144/http://charlesroff.com/index.php

Scottish photographers
People from Inverness
1952 births
2017 deaths